Sheldon Blair Jackson, Jr. (born July 24, 1976) is a former professional American football tight end who played for the Buffalo Bills from 1999 to 2001.

External links
Pro-Football-Reference

1976 births
Buffalo Bills players
Living people
American football tight ends
People from Diamond Bar, California
Players of American football from California
Sportspeople from Los Angeles County, California